The 1973–74 Montreal Canadiens season was the 65th season in team history. The Canadiens qualified for the playoffs, losing in the first round to the New York Rangers.

Off-season
Ken Dryden shocked the hockey world as he sat out the entire 1973–74 season. He had won a Vezina Trophy and helped lead Canada past Russia in the dramatic Hockey Summit of 1972. Despite his bargaining power, most players in Dryden's position would have simply accepted what the Canadiens were giving him. Dryden bolted training camp, while general manager Sam Pollock fumed.

Regular season
Wayne Thomas replaced Dryden as the starting goaltender and appeared in 42 games. Frank Mahovlich led the team in scoring with 80 points, while Yvan Cournoyer led the team in goals with 40.

Final standings

Playoffs
The Canadiens qualified for the playoffs in second place, setting up a match-up with the third-place New York Rangers. The Rangers defeated the Canadiens twice at the Forum to win the series four games to two. Rookie goaltender Michel Larocque played all six games for the Canadiens.

Schedule and results

Playoffs
 4/10/1974 New York Rangers 1–4
 4/11/1974 New York Rangers 4–1
 4/13/1974 at New York Rangers 4–2
 4/14/1974 at New York Rangers 4–6
 4/16/1974 New York Rangers 2–3
 4/18/1974 at New York Rangers 2–5

Awards and records
 Bill Masterton Memorial Trophy: Henri Richard, Montreal Canadiens

Player statistics

Regular season
Scoring

Goaltending

Playoffs
Scoring

Goaltending

Transactions

Draft picks

See also
 1973–74 NHL season

References
 Canadiens on Hockey Database
 Canadiens on NHL Reference

Montreal Canadiens seasons
Mon
Mon